The 1952 Leeds South East by-election was held on 7 February 1952.  It was held due to the elevation to a hereditary peerage of the incumbent Labour MP, James Milner.  It was retained by the Labour candidate, Denis Healey.

References

South East, 1952
Leeds South East by-election
Leeds South East by-election
Leeds South East by-election, 1952
Leeds South East by-election